Uchkoʻprik (also spelled Uchkuprik) is an urban-type settlement in Fergana Region, Uzbekistan. It is the administrative center of Uchkoʻprik District. Its population was 4,277 people in 1989, and 4,300 in 2016.

References

Populated places in Fergana Region
Urban-type settlements in Uzbekistan